Below is a list of museums and art galleries in Rajasthan, India:

{| class="wikitable"
!Name
!District
!Details
|-
|Government Museum, Ajmer
|Ajmer
|
|-
|Alwar Government Museum
|Alwar
|
|-
|Government Museum, Bharatpur
|Bharatpur
|
|-
|Birla Museum, Pilani
|Jhunjhunu
|
|-
|Fort Museum, Junagarh Fort, Bikaner
|Bikaner
|
|-
|Ganga Golden Jubilee Museum, Bikaner
|Bikaner
|
|-
|Government Museum, Bikaner
|Bikaner
|
|-
|Rajasthan State Archives, Bikaner
|Bikaner
|
|-
|Fateh Prakash Palace Museum, Chittaurgarh
|Chittorgarh
|
|-
|Dungarpur Museum
|Dungarpur
|
|-
|Albert Hall Museum, Jaipur
|Jaipur
|
|-
|Amer Archaeological Museum, Amer, India
|Jaipur
|
|-
|Bairat Virat Nagar Museum
|Jaipur
|
|-
|City Palace, Jaipur
|Jaipur
|
|-
|Hawa Mahal Museum, Jaipur
|Jaipur
|
|-
|Jaigarh Arms museum, jaipur
|Jaipur
|
|-
|Jawahar Kala Kendra, Jaipur
|Jaipur
|
|-
|Maharaja Sawai Man Singh Ji Museum, Jaipur
|Jaipur
|
|-
|Modern Art Gallery, Ram Niwas Bagh
|Jaipur
|
|-
|Government Museum, Jaisalmer
|Jaisalmer
|
|-
|Jaisalmer Folklore Museum
|Jaisalmer
|
|-
|Government Museum, Jhalawar
|Jhalawar
|
|-
|Government Museum, Jodhpur
|Jodhpur
|
|-
|Mehrangarh Fort Museum, Jodhpur
|Jodhpur
|
|-
|Rajasthan Oriental Research Institute, Jodhpur
|Jodhpur
|
|-
|Umaid Bhawan Palace Museum, Jodhpur
|Jodhpur
|
|-
|Government Museum, Pali
|Pali
|
|-
|Government Museum, Sikar
|Sikar
|
|-
|Rajasthan Arabic and Persian Research Institute, Tonk
|Tonk
|
|-
|Bharatiya Lok Kala Mandal, Udaipur
|Udaipur
|
|-
|Government Museum, Ahar
|Udaipur
|
|
|-
|Castle Kanota Museum,
|Jaipur
|
|}

Gallery

See also
 List of museums in India

External links
 http://museumsrajasthan.gov.in/museums.htm
  Birla Museum, Pilani

Museums and art galleries
 
Rajasthan